Al Belletto (January 3, 1928 – December 26, 2014) was an American jazz saxophonist and clarinetist.

Early life and education 
Belletto was born and raised in New Orleans, where he led his own bands as a college student. He graduated from Warren Easton Charter High School before studying music at Loyola University New Orleans and earning a master's degree from Louisiana State University.

Career 
Belletto played with Sharkey Bonano, Louis Prima, Wingy Manone and the Dukes of Dixieland in the 1940s and 1950s, then led his own band for several albums on Capitol Records from 1952. He and his ensemble became part of Woody Herman's band for United States Department of State tours of South America in 1958 and 1959.

In the 1960s, Belletto worked at the New Orleans Playboy Club fronting the house band and serving as Musical/Entertainment Director, booking nationally known acts into the venue.

Personal life 
Belletto and his wife, Linda, had one son. Belletto died in Metairie, Louisiana, in 2014.

Discography
Sounds and Songs (Capitol Records, 1955)
Half and Half (Capitol, 1956)
Whisper Not (Capitol, 1957)
The Big Sound (King Records, 1962)
Coach's Choice (ART Records, 1973)
Jazznocracy (Louisiana Red Hot, 1998)

References

Jazz musicians from New Orleans
American jazz saxophonists
American male saxophonists
American jazz clarinetists
1928 births
2014 deaths
American male jazz musicians
20th-century American saxophonists
Louisiana State University alumni